Events from the year 1777 in the United States.

Incumbents
President of the Second Continental Congress: John Hancock (until October 29), Henry Laurens (starting November 1)

Events

January–March

 January 2 – American Revolutionary War: Battle of the Assunpink Creek, also known as the Second Battle of Trenton: American forces under the command of George Washington repulse a British attack near Trenton, New Jersey.
 January 3 – American Revolutionary War: Battle of Princeton: American general George Washington defeats British general Charles Cornwallis.
January 12 – Mission Santa Clara de Asís founded in what is now Santa Clara, California.
 January 15 – Vermont declares its independence from New York, becoming the Vermont Republic, an independent country, a status it retains until it joins the United States as the 14th state in 1791.
 January 20 – American Revolutionary War: Battle of Millstone, part of the Forage War
 February 1 – American Revolutionary War: Battle of Drake's Farm, part of the Forage War
 February 8 – American Revolutionary War: Battle of Quibbletown, part of the Forage War
 February 12 – John McKinly is sworn in as the first president of Delaware.
 February 23 – American Revolutionary War: Battle of Spanktown, part of the Forage War
 March 5 – Thomas Wharton Jr. is sworn in as the first president of Pennsylvania.
 March 8 – American Revolutionary War: Battle of Pun Hill, part of the Forage War
 March 21 – Thomas Johnson is sworn as the first governor of Maryland.

April–June

 April 13 – American Revolutionary War: Battle of Bound Brook: A British and Hessian force led by Lieutenant General Charles Cornwallis surprises a Continental Army outpost in New Jersey commanded by Major General Benjamin Lincoln.
 April 26 – American Revolutionary War: 16-year-old Sybil Ludington is said to have ridden  through the night to warn militiamen under the control of her father Henry that British troops had raided Danbury, Connecticut.
 April 27 – American Revolutionary War: The Battle of Ridgefield: A British invasion force engages and defeats Continental Army regulars and militia irregulars at Ridgefield, Connecticut.
 May 16 – Lachlan McIntosh and Button Gwinnett shoot each other during a duel near Savannah, Georgia. Gwinnett, a signer of the United States Declaration of Independence, dies three days later.
 May 17 – American Revolutionary War: Battle of Thomas Creek.
 May 23 – American Revolutionary War: Meigs Raid.
 June 13 – American Revolution: The Marquis de Lafayette lands near Charleston, South Carolina to help the Continental Congress train its army.
 June 14 – The Stars and Stripes is adopted by the Continental Congress as the flag of the United States.
 June 26 – American Revolutionary War: Battle of Short Hills.

July–September

 July 4 – The first organized Independence Day celebration in Philadelphia: included fireworks set off from the city's commons.
 July 6 – American Revolutionary War: Siege of Fort Ticonderoga – After a bombardment by British artillery under General John Burgoyne, American forces retreat from Fort Ticonderoga, New York.
 July 7 – American Revolutionary War: Battle of Hubbardton – British forces engage American troops retreating from Fort Ticonderoga.
 July 8
The Constitution of Vermont is adopted. This constitution was the first in what is now the territory of the United States to prohibit slavery, grant suffrage to non-landowning males, and require free public education.
American Revolutionary War: Battle of Fort Anne.
 July 30 – George Clinton is sworn in as the first governor of New York.
 July 31 – The U.S. Second Continental Congress passes a resolution that the services of Marquis de Lafayette "be accepted, and that, in consideration of his zeal, illustrious family and connexions, he have the rank and commission of major-general of the United States."
 August 2–23 – American Revolutionary War: Siege of Fort Stanwix.
 August 6 – American Revolutionary War: Battle of Oriskany – Loyalists gain a tactical victory over Patriots; Iroquois fight on both sides.
 August 13–14 – American Revolutionary War: Battle of Machias.
 August 16 – American Revolutionary War: Battle of Bennington – British forces are defeated by American troops at Walloomsac, New York.
 August 22
 American Revolutionary War: Battle of Staten Island.
 American Revolutionary War: Battle of Setauket.
 September – American Revolutionary War: Siege of Fort Henry.
 September 3 – American Revolutionary War: Battle of Cooch's Bridge – In a minor skirmish in New Castle County, Delaware, the flag of the United States was flown in battle for the first time.
 September 11 – American Revolutionary War – Battle of Brandywine: The British gain a major victory in Chester County, Pennsylvania.
 September 16 – American Revolutionary War: Battle of the Clouds.
 September 19 – American Revolutionary War: First Battle of Saratoga: Battle of Freeman's Farm – Patriot forces withstand a British attack at Saratoga, New York.
 September 21 – American Revolutionary War: Battle of Paoli.
 September 26 – American Revolutionary War: British troops occupy Philadelphia.
 September 27 – Lancaster, Pennsylvania is the capital of the United States for one day.

October–December

 October 4 – American Revolution – Battle of Germantown: Troops under George Washington are repelled by British troops under Sir William Howe.
 October 6 – American Revolutionary War: Battle of Forts Clinton and Montgomery: British troops capture Fort Clinton and Fort Montgomery (Hudson River) and are able to dismantle the Hudson River Chain.
 October 7 – American Revolution – Second Battle of Saratoga: Battle of Bemis Heights: British General John Burgoyne is defeated by American troops.
 October 17 – American Revolution – Battle of Saratoga: British General John Burgoyne surrenders to the American troops.
 October 22 – American Revolutionary War: Battle of Red Bank.
 November 15 – American Revolution: After 16 months of debate, the Continental Congress approves the Articles of Confederation in the temporary American capital at York, Pennsylvania.
 November 17 – The Articles of Confederation are submitted to the states for ratification.
 November 25 – American Revolutionary War: Battle of Gloucester
 November 29 – San Jose, California is founded.  It is the first pueblo in Spanish Alta California.
 December 5–8 – American Revolutionary War: Battle of White Marsh
 December 11 – American Revolutionary War: Battle of Matson's Ford
 December 18 – The United States celebrates its first Thanksgiving as a nation, marking the victory by the Americans over General John Burgoyne in the Battle of Saratoga in October.
 December 19 – American Revolution: George Washington's Continental Army goes into winter quarters at Valley Forge, Pennsylvania.
 December 20: – Morocco becomes the first country to recognize the independence of the United States.

Dates unknown
In the St. Louis region, a brood of 13-year cicadas emerges at the same time as a large brood of 17-year cicadas.

Ongoing
 American Revolutionary War (1775–1783)
 Slavery in the United States

Births
 January 1 – Micah Hawkins, music theater composer (died 1825)
 March 17 – Roger Brooke Taney, politician, lawyer and judge (died 1864)
 April 12 – Henry Clay, U.S. Senator from Kentucky 1806-1807, 1810-1811, 1831-1842 & 1849-1852 (died 1852)
 April 30 – Carl Gauss, Famous Mathematician from Brunswick, Germany (died 1855)
 June 12 – Robert Clark, politician (died 1837)
 June 23 – Frederick Bates, politician (died 1825)
 July – Thomas Clayton, U.S. Senator from Delaware 1824-1827 & 1837-1847 (died 1854)
 August 12 – George Wolf, politician (died 1840)
 October 16
 Levi Barber, surveyor, court administrator, banker and legislator (died 1833)
 Lorenzo Dow, Methodist preacher (died 1834)
 November 14 – Nathaniel Claiborne, politician (died 1859)
 November 24 – Samuel Butts, militia officer (killed in action 1814)
 December 10 – William Conner, trader and politician (died 1855)
 Date unknown
 William Bellinger Bulloch, U.S. Senator from Georgia in 1813 (died 1852)
 Thomas Day, Connecticut judge (died 1855)
 Jesse B. Thomas, U.S. Senator from Illinois 1818-1829 (died 1853)

Deaths
 January 3 – William Leslie, British Army captain, killed at Battle of Princeton (born 1751 in Scotland)
 January 12 – Hugh Mercer, Continental Army brigadier general and physician, mortally wounded at Battle of Princeton (born 1726 in Scotland)
 February 19 – Seth Pomeroy, gunsmith and soldier (born 1706)
 May 19 – Button Gwinnett, signatory of the Declaration of Independence, 2nd Governor of Georgia in 1777 (born 1735 in Great Britain)
 August 11 – William Tennent III, Presbyterian pastor and patriot (born 1740)
 September 22 – John Bartram, botanist, horticulturalist and explorer (born 1699)
 October 4 – Francis Nash, Continental Army brigadier general, mortally wounded at Battle of Germantown (born c.1742)
 October 7 – Simon Fraser, British Army general, killed in Battle of Bemis Heights (born 1729 in Scotland)
 November 10 – Cornstalk (Hokoleskwa), Shawnee chief, murdered (born c.1720)

See also
Timeline of the American Revolution (1760–1789)

References

External links
 

 
1770s in the United States
United States
United States
Years of the 18th century in the United States